Kilbagie railway station served the town of Clackmannan, Clackmannanshire, Scotland from 1894 to 1930 on the Kincardine Line.

History 
The station opened on 17 September 1894 by the North British Railway. To the west was Kilbagie Paper Mill served by a line to the south. The station closed on 7 July 1930.

References

External links 

Disused railway stations in Clackmannanshire
Railway stations in Great Britain opened in 1894
Railway stations in Great Britain closed in 1930
Former North British Railway stations
1894 establishments in Scotland
1939 disestablishments in Scotland